Derain may refer to:
Derain quadrangle, a quadrangle on Mercury
André Derain (1880–1954), French artist, painter, sculptor and co-founder of Fauvism
Derain (crater), a crater on Mercury named after him
Henri Derain (1902–1960), French racing cyclist

French-language surnames